Nabavi is a common Iranian family name. It may refer to several people, including:

 Atefeh Nabavi, Iranian student activist
 Azad Nabavi, Iranian-born researcher in Germany
 Behzad Nabavi, Iranian politician
 Ebrahim Nabavi, Iranian satirist
 Gita Nabavi, Swedish politician

Iranian-language surnames